On 11 September 2017, the Croatian city of Zadar and the surrounding area were affected by a mesoscale convective system producing extreme rainfall, which caused a flash flood. Around  of rain, threefold the monthly average for September, was recorded during 24 hours on 10–11 September. Nearly  fell in the space of two hours in the morning of 11 September. Outside Zadar, flooding occurred in Sali and Sukošan. The town of Nin was the worst hit, as the floodwaters overwhelmed its embankment, and a state of emergency was declared there. There were no fatalities. The flood caused an estimated 322 million Croatian kuna in damage (€43 million). Numerous houses, apartments and institutions were damaged, including Zadar cemetery, hospitals, roads and a shopping mall. The torrent damaged the frame of an apartment complex in construction. The roads Zadar–Ražanac and Poljica-Brig – Nin were washed out. Zadar's water treatment plant suffered 10 million kuna in damage, while the cost to repair roads was estimated to be over 4 million kuna. The salt ponds in Nin lost the year's salt harvest to the flood.

The rainfall and flooding was caused by the terrain surrounding the city. Zadar, a coastal city, lies in the flat region of Ravni Kotari. However, the Velebit mountain range extends along the coast behind Ravni Kotari, and caused the storms arriving from Tyrrhenian Sea in the west to undergo orographic lift and continually produce rain while passing over Zadar. Over 25,000 lightning strikes were recorded near Zadar.  of rain fell in Zadar proper, while  was recorded in nearby Zemunik.

On 11 September 2017, Zadar was pronounced to have recorded the most rainfall of all meteorological stations on earth for this date, beating out rainfall totals caused by Hurricane Irma in Florida, while Gospić was placed 8th. However, the data was later corrected to include a higher total for Alabat Island, Philippines, due to Tropical Storm Maring.

References

Further reading 
 
 Photos of the flood at MeteoAdriatic.net

Floods in Croatia
Zadar flash flood
Zadar flash flood
History of Zadar
Zadar flash flood
Weather events in Croatia
2017 meteorology
2017 disasters in Croatia